Geetanjali Shree (born 12 June 1957), also known as Geetanjali Pandey, is an Indian Hindi-language novelist and short-story writer based in New Delhi, India. She is the author of several short stories and five novels. Her 2000 novel Mai was shortlisted for the Crossword Book Award in 2001, while its English translation by Nita Kumar was published by Niyogi Books in 2017. In 2022, her novel Ret Samadhi (2018), translated into English as Tomb of Sand by Daisy Rockwell, won the International Booker Prize.  Aside from fiction, she has written critical works on Premchand.

Early life and education 
Shree was born in the city of Mainpuri in Uttar Pradesh state on 12 June 1957. As her father, Anirudh Pandey, was a civil servant, her family lived in various towns of Uttar Pradesh. Shree says that it was this upbringing in Uttar Pradesh, along with a lack of children's books in English, that gave her a rich connection to Hindi.  She is ancestrally from Ghazipur District, Gondaur village.

At university, she studied history.  She completed a BA at Lady Shri Ram College, and a master's degree from Jawaharlal Nehru University in New Delhi. After beginning her PhD work at Maharaja Sayajirao University of Baroda on the Hindi writer Munshi Premchand, Shree became more interested in Hindi literature.  She wrote her first short story during her PhD, and turned to writing after graduation.

Works
Her first story, "Bel Patra" (1987), was published in the literary magazine Hans and was followed by a collection of short stories Anugoonj (1991).

The English translation of her novel Mai catapulted her to fame. The novel is about three generations of women and the men around them, in a North Indian middle-class family. Mai has been translated into several languages, including Serbian and Korean. It has also been translated into English by Nita Kumar, who was awarded the Sahitya Akademi Translation Prize, and into Urdu by Bashir Unwan with a preface by Intizar Hussain.

Shree's second novel Hamara Shahar Us Baras is set loosely after the incidents of Babri Masjid demolition.

Her fourth novel, Khālī jagah (2006), has been translated into English (by Nivedita Menon as The Empty Space), French (by Nicola Pozza as Une place vide), and German (by Georg Lechner and Nivedita Menon as Im leeren Raum).

Her fifth novel, Ret Samadhi (2018), has been commended by Alka Saraogi for "its sweeping imagination and sheer power of language, unprecedented and uninhibited". It has been translated into English by Daisy Rockwell as Tomb of Sand, and into French by Annie Montaut as Au-delà de la frontière. On 26 May 2022, Tomb of Sand won the International Booker Prize, becoming the first book in Hindi and the first from an Indian writer to receive the accolade.

Academic publications
Between Two Worlds: An Intellectual Biography of Premchand
"Premchand and Industrialism: A Study in Attitudinal  Ambivalence", The Indian Economic and Social History Review, XIX(2), 1982 
"Premchand and the Peasantry: Constrained Radicalism", Economic and Political Weekly, XVIII(26), 25 June 1983.
"The North Indian Intelligentsia and the Hindu-Muslim Question"

Other activities 
Shree also participates in theatre and works with Vivadi, a theatre group comprising writers, artists, dancers, and painters.

Awards and honours
Shree is the recipient of the Indu Sharma Katha Samman award and has been a fellow of the Ministry of Culture, India, and Japan Foundation.

In 2022, Tomb of Sand became the first Hindi-language novel shortlisted for the International Booker Prize and subsequently won the prize.

In December 2022, Shree was named on the BBC's 100 Women list as one of the world's inspiring and influential women of the year.

See also
 List of Hindi-language authors
 Tomb of Sand

Explanatory notes

References

Living people
1957 births
20th-century Indian novelists
20th-century Indian short story writers
20th-century Indian women writers
Indian feminists
Indian women novelists
Indian women short story writers
International Booker Prize winners
Novelists from Uttar Pradesh
People from Ghazipur
Women writers from Uttar Pradesh
BBC 100 Women